Amanda Klara Georgiadis Tenfjord (born 9 January 1997) is a Greek-Norwegian singer and songwriter. She represented Greece in the Eurovision Song Contest 2022 with the song "Die Together".

Early life and education 
Tenfjord was born on 9 January 1997 to a Norwegian mother and a Greek father. According to her own statements, she was born in Ioannina, Greece, but this is contradicted by a reliable secondary source which states that she was born in the Central Hospital of Møre og Romsdal in Ålesund, Norway. She was baptised in Vatne in October 1998.

Tenfjord lived her first years in Ioannina, before she and her family moved to Tennfjord in Norway. She attended  in Ålesund. In 2015, she moved to Trondheim to study medicine at the Norwegian University of Science and Technology. In 2019, she announced that she had put her studies on hold to focus on her musical career.

Career 
Tenfjord started taking piano lessons at the age of five. Tenfjord's song "Run" won the Music Prize in 2015 and appeared in an advertising video for Personskadeforbundet LTN in 2014. In 2016, she participated in the music competition The Stream on TV 2, where she was placed among the top 30 participants. In 2019, she appeared in a programme on NRK P3 with the song "Let Me Think", and performed at the music festival Trondheim Calling. Tenfjord has also toured with the Norwegian band Highasakite. Tenfjord was awarded the Haram Municipality Youth Culture Prize in 2019. On 15 December 2021, she was announced as the Greek representative for the Eurovision Song Contest 2022.
Tenfjord was the opening act for Madrugada in September 2022 at the Panathenaic Stadium in Athens. Tenfjord received a price of honour from both the county governor in Epirus, Alekos Kaxrimani, and from the Major of Ioannina, Moses Elisaf, for her contribution for Greece in Eurovision Song Contest 2022.
On October 21, 2022 she released her debut album 'In Hindsight', featuring 13 songs.

Discography

Studio albums 
 In Hindsight (2022)

Extended plays 
 First Impression (2018)
 Miss the Way You Missed Me (2021)

Singles 
 "Run" (2014)
 "I Need Lions" (2016)
 "Man of Iron" (2017)
 "First Impression" (2018)
 "No Thanks" (2018)
 "Let Me Think" (2018)
 "Pick a Card" (2018)
 "The Floor Is Lava" (2019)
 "Troubled Water" (2019)
 "Kill the Lonely" (2019)
 "As If" (2020)
 "Pressure" (2020)
 "Then I Fell in Love" (2020)
 "Miss the Way You Missed Me" (2021)
 "Promises" (2021)
 "Die Together" (2022)
 "Plans" (2022)
 "All In" (2022)
 "Aman" (feat. Evangelia) (2022)
 "I'll Stay" (2022)

Notelist

References

External links
 

1997 births
Living people
Musicians from Ålesund
21st-century Greek women singers
21st-century Norwegian women singers
21st-century Norwegian singers
English-language singers from Greece
English-language singers from Norway
Eurovision Song Contest entrants for Greece
Eurovision Song Contest entrants of 2022
Greek pop singers
Greek songwriters
Norwegian people of Greek descent
Greek people of Norwegian descent
Citizens of Greece through descent
Norwegian pop singers
Norwegian songwriters